Raychelle Awour Omamo (born July 1962) is a Kenyan lawyer and politician and an advocate of the High Court of Kenya. From 2020 to 2022, she was the Kenyan Foreign Affairs Minister.

Background and education 
Omamo studied law at the University of Kent at Canterbury, UK. She is a Senior Counsel and an Advocate of the High Court for 27 years. She was the first female chairperson of the Law Society of Kenya from 2001 to 2003 after serving as a council member from 1996 to 2000 and Kenyan first female ambassador to France, Portugal, The Holy See and Serbia as well as the Permanent Delegate of the Kenya to UNESCO. She was a member of the Task Force on the Establishment of the Truth Justice and Reconciliation Commission for Kenya.

Career 
She served as the Cabinet Secretary for Foreign Affairs. Previously, she served as the Cabinet Secretary for Defence for 7 years in the Uhuru Kenyatta administration, the first female in the country to hold the post. She is currently the Vice-President of the East African Law Society, Kenya’s ambassador and Director Mo-Consulty Ltd.

References

Alumni of the University of Kent
20th-century Kenyan lawyers
Kenyan women lawyers
Ambassadors of Kenya to France
Ambassadors of Kenya to Portugal
Ambassadors of Kenya to the Holy See
Ambassadors of Kenya to Serbia
Foreign ministers of Kenya
Defense ministers of Kenya
Living people
Women government ministers of Kenya
Female defence ministers
21st-century Kenyan women politicians
21st-century Kenyan politicians
1952 births
Female foreign ministers
21st-century Kenyan lawyers

She is a daughter to the late cabinet minister Hon. William Odongo Omamo.